William Norris (1719–1791) was an English clergyman and antiquarian.

Life
He was brother to Robert Norris. He was elected Fellow of the Society of Antiquaries on 4 April 1754, and that year began to assist Joseph Ames as secretary to the society. On Ames's death, in 1759, Norris became sole secretary, and held the post as an effective official until 1786, when he retired on account of ill-health.

He was for several years corrector for the press to Thomas Baskett, the royal printer. He died in Camden Street, Islington, in November 1791, and was buried in the burial-ground of St James, Pentonville, on 29 November.

References

Attribution

1719 births
1791 deaths
18th-century English Anglican priests
English antiquarians
Fellows of the Society of Antiquaries of London